The 1980 season in Swedish football, starting January 1980 and ending December 1980:

Honours

Official titles

Competitions

Promotions, relegations and qualifications

Promotions

Relegations

Domestic results

Allsvenskan 1980

Division 2 Norra 1980

Division 2 Södra 1980

Svenska Cupen 1979–80 
Final

National team results

Notes

References 
Print

Online

 
Seasons in Swedish football